Saturnino Martín Cerezo (11 February 1866 – 2 December 1945) was a Spanish military officer. Cerezo was best known for his commanding of Spanish defenders during the Siege of Baler.

Biography 
Cerezo joined the Spanish army at a young age. During the Philippine War of Independence, Cerezo served as an office with the Spanish army garrisoning the islands, then a Spanish imperial possession. In 1898, with the war going badly for the Spanish, Cerezo's unit was assigned to the town of Baler. In June 1898, Cerezo's unit was ambushed by Philippine guerillas—Cerezo's commanding officer, Juan Alonso Zayas, was seriously wounded, and the Spanish were soon besieged in a church in Baler. Cerezo took command of the garrison when Zayas succumbed to his injuries in October. The siege continued until 2 June 1899, when the Spanish garrison was informed of the End of the Spanish-American War and the subsequent end of Spanish rule in the Philippines. Cerezo and the surviving garrison were evacuated to Spain, and their defense of Baler was widely praised in Spain.

References 

1866 births
Spanish soldiers
1945 deaths